Lee Sun-young (born 20 April 1984) is a South Korean long-distance runner who specializes in the marathon.

She finished seventh in 10,000 metres at the 2005 Asian Championships and competed in the 2008 Olympic marathon.

She won her first national marathon in 2008, winning the JoongAng Seoul Marathon in 2:29:58. She improved further the following year as achieved a personal best time of 2:27:48 at the Seoul International Marathon in March 2009. She won the JoongAng Marathon for a second time later that year, running a tactical race and beating the next best competitor by over three minutes.

Achievements

References

External links

1984 births
Living people
South Korean female marathon runners
Athletes (track and field) at the 2008 Summer Olympics
Olympic athletes of South Korea
Athletes (track and field) at the 2010 Asian Games
Asian Games competitors for South Korea
South Korean female long-distance runners
21st-century South Korean women